Kim Yu-mi (Hangul: 김유미, born April 26, 1990), also known as Yumi Kim, is a South Korean beauty pageant titleholder and actress who was crowned Miss Korea 2012, Miss Universe Korea 2013 and represented her country in the Miss Universe 2013 pageant. She is currently represented by Starhaus Entertainment.

Education
Kim Yu-mi is a film major at Konkuk University in South Korea.

Pageantry

Miss Korea 2012
Kim Yu-mi was crowned Miss Korea 2012 in an event held at Kyung Hee University Grand Peace Palace in Seoul on July 6, 2012, beating out 53 other contestants.
Since first time, HanKook Daily News, also known as Miss Korea Organization, announced the Miss Korea winner's title name as ′Miss Universe Korea′ during Miss Korea 2012 pageant. 
Yu-mi became Miss Korea 2012 and Miss Universe Korea 2013 at that final night. Also, Yu-mi won "Miss Photogenic" 2012.
The outgoing titleholder Miss Korea 2011 Lee Seong-hye named Miss Universe Korea 2012 through the Miss Korea Organization, HanKook Daily News during Miss Korea 2012 pageant.

Miss Universe 2013
Kim Yu-mi participated in the Miss Universe 2013 representing Korea but failed to place in the semifinals.

Filmography

Television drama

Music videos

Cosmetic surgery controversy
Shortly after winning the 2012 Miss Korea pageant, younger photos of Ms. Kim appeared online showing a dramatic difference in her appearance before and after cosmetic surgery, causing a stir in the Korean media about the prevalence of cosmetic surgery. To which she responded in an interview "I was shocked that the papers made it out like I claimed to have been a natural beauty, I never once said that I was born beautiful."

References

External links

 Miss Korea 2012 profile
 Miss Universe 2013 profile
 Agency profile
 
 

1990 births
Living people
Konkuk University alumni
Actresses from Seoul
Miss Korea winners
Miss Universe 2013 contestants
21st-century South Korean actresses
South Korean television actresses